The federal government of Iraq is defined under the current Constitution, approved in 2005, as an Islamic, democratic, federal parliamentary republic. The federal government is composed of the executive, legislative, and judicial branches, as well as numerous independent commissions.

Federalism in Iraq

Federalism law
Article 114 of the Constitution of Iraq provided that no new region may be created before the Iraqi National Assembly has passed a law that provides the procedures for forming the region. A law was passed in October 2006 after an agreement was reached with the Iraqi Accord Front to form the constitutional review committee and to defer implementation of the law for 18 months. Legislators from the Iraqi Accord Front, Sadrist Movement and Islamic Virtue Party all opposed the bill.

Creating a new region
Under the Federalism Law a region can be created out of one or more existing governorates or two or more existing regions. A governorate can also join an existing region to create a new region. There is no limit to the number of governorates that can form a region, unlike the Transitional Administrative Law of the Iraqi Interim Government which limited it to three.

A new region can be proposed by one third or more of the council members in each affected governorate plus 500 voters or by one tenth or more voters in each affected governorate. A referendum must then be held within three months, which requires a simple majority in favour to pass.

In the event of competing proposals, the multiple proposals are put to a ballot and the proposal with the most supporters is put to the referendum.

In the event of an affirmative referendum a Transitional Legislative Assembly is elected for one year, which has the task of writing a constitution for the Region, which is then put to a referendum requiring a simple majority to pass.

The President, Prime Minister and Ministers of the region are elected by simple majority, in contrast to the Iraqi National Assembly which requires two thirds support.

Executive branch
The executive branch is composed of the President and the Council of Ministers.

President

The President of the Republic is the head of state and "safeguards the commitment to the Constitution and the preservation of Iraq's independence, sovereignty, unity, the security of its territories in accordance with the provisions of the Constitution." The President is elected by the Council of Representatives by a two-thirds majority, and is limited to two four-year terms. The President ratifies treaties and laws passed by the Council of Representatives, issues pardons on the recommendation of the Prime Minister, and performs the "duty of the Higher Command of the armed forces for ceremonial and honorary purposes."

There is also a Vice President which assumes the office of the President in case of his absence or removal.

Council of Ministers

The Council of Ministers is composed of the Prime Minister as head of government and his cabinet. The President of Iraq names the nominee of the Council of Representatives bloc with the largest number to form the Cabinet. The Prime Minister is the direct executive authority responsible for the general policy of the State and the commander-in-chief of the armed forces, directs the Council of Ministers, and presides over its meetings and has the right to dismiss the Ministers on the consent of the Council of Representatives.

The cabinet is responsible for overseeing their respective ministries, proposing laws, preparing the budget, negotiating and signing international agreements and treaties, and appointing undersecretaries, ambassadors, the Chief of Staff of the Armed Forces and his assistants, Division Commanders or higher, the Director of the National Intelligence Service, and heads of security institutions.

List of ministries
Ministry of Human Rights
Ministry of Defense
Ministry of Displacement & migration
Ministry of Electricity
Ministry of Agriculture
Ministry of Finance
Ministry of Justice
Ministry of Science & Technology
Ministry of Housing & Construction
Ministry of Culture
Ministry of Communications
Ministry of Education
Ministry of Health
Ministry of Industry & Minerals
Ministry of Interior
Ministry of Labor & Social Affairs
Ministry of Oil
Ministry of Planning
Ministry of Trade
Ministry of Municipalities & Public Works
Ministry of Transportation
Ministry of Water Resources
Ministry of Youth & Sports
Ministry of Higher Education and Scientific Research

Legislative branch
The legislative branch is composed of the Council of Representatives and a Federation Council. As of August 2012, the Federation Council had not yet come into existence.

Council of Representatives

The Council of Representatives is the main elected body of Iraq. The Constitution defines the "number of members at a ratio of one representative per 100,000 Iraqi persons representing the entire Iraqi people." The members are elected for terms of 4 years.

The council elects the President of Iraq; approves the appointment of the members of the Federal Court of Cassation, the Chief Public Prosecutor, and the President of Judicial Oversight Commission on proposal by the Higher Juridical Council; and approves the appointment of the Army Chief of Staff, his assistants and those of the rank of division commanders and above, and the director of the intelligence service, on proposal by the Cabinet.

Federation Council

The Federation Council will be composed of representatives from the regions and the governorates that are not organized in a region. The council is to be regulated by law by the Council of Representatives. As of November 2018, the Federation Council had not yet come into existence.

Judicial branch

The federal judiciary is composed of the Higher Judicial Council, the Supreme Court, the Court of Cassation, the Public Prosecution Department, the Judiciary Oversight Commission, and other federal courts that are regulated by law. One such court is the Central Criminal Court.

Higher Judicial Council

The Higher Judicial Council manages and supervises the affairs of the federal judiciary. It oversees the affairs of the various judicial committees, nominates the Chief Justice and members of the Court of Cassation, the Chief Public Prosecutor, and the Chief Justice of the Judiciary Oversight Commission, and drafts the budget of the judiciary. In 2013, the Council of Representatives passed the Iraqi Federal Court Act, which forbids the Chief Justice of the Supreme Court from also being the head of the Judicial Council, and replaced him with the Chief Justice of the Court of Cassation.

Supreme Court

The Supreme Court is an independent judicial body that interprets the constitution and determines the constitutionality of laws and regulations. It acts as a final court of appeals, settles disputes amongst or between the federal government and the regions and governorates, municipalities, and local administrations, and settles accusations directed against the President, the Prime Minister and the Ministers. It also ratifies the final results of the general elections for the Council of Representatives.

Central Criminal Court
The Central Criminal Court of Iraq is the main criminal court of Iraq. The CCCI is based on an inquisitorial system and consists of two chambers: an investigative court, and a criminal court.

Independent commissions and institutions
The Independent High Commission for Human Rights, the Independent High Electoral Commission, and the Commission on Integrity are independent commissions subject to monitoring by the Council of Representatives. The Central Bank of Iraq, the Board of Supreme Audit, the Communications and Media Commission, and the Endowment Commission are financially and administratively independent institutions. The Foundation of Martyrs is attached to the Council of Ministers. The Federal Public Service Council regulates the affairs of the federal public service, including appointment and promotion.

See also

 Politics of Iraq
 Regions of Iraq
 Governorates of Iraq

References

External links
Iraqi Government – Official website 
Iraqi Government Official Spokesman 
President of Iraq 
Cabinet of Iraq 
Prime Minister of Iraq 
Parliament of Iraq (Council of Representatives)  (Google-identified malware)
Iraq Chief of State and Cabinet Members from the CIA